Richard John Ridings (born 19 September 1958) is an English actor. He portrayed Alan Ashburn in the ITV television drama Fat Friends, Bernard Green in the BBC One comedy-drama Common as Muck, and is the voice of Daddy Pig in Peppa Pig. He trained as an actor at Bretton Hall College, then the Bristol Old Vic Theatre School. He is the father of singer-songwriter Freya Ridings.

Career
He has had roles in a series of other television series and feature films, among them Clockwise, The Ink Thief, Red Dwarf, Randall and Hopkirk (Deceased), Who Framed Roger Rabbit, Fierce Creatures and as Silas in Highlander: The Series. Ridings voices Daddy Pig in the animated children's series Peppa Pig, Father Christmas and Boss Dwarf in Ben and Holly's Little Kingdom, and Grooby in Q Pootle 5. In 2005, he took the lead role in the BBC Radio 4 sitcom Clement Doesn't Live Here Anymore, playing a sexually obsessed overweight ghost alongside Steve Furst and Amanda Abbington. The second series was transmitted in May, 2007.

Ridings has also provided voiceovers in video games, including the voice of Sarge in Quake III Arena, the Mentor in Dungeon Keeper and Dungeon Keeper 2, Mendechaus in War for the Overworld, Roach in Heavenly Sword, General Pig in Puppeteer, and ex-lawman Giles the Farmer in Fable II, on the Xbox 360 video game console. In 2010 he also provided the voice of Pigsy, in the video game Enslaved: Odyssey to the West and of Cornell (the Dark Lord of the Lycanthropes) in Castlevania: Lords of Shadow. In 2011 he provided the voice of the leader of the Machina refugees, Miqol, in Xenoblade Chronicles and in 2013 he provided the voice of the Hunter in DmC: Devil May Cry, the Daemon Lord in Castlevania: Lords of Shadow - Mirror of Fate, and the Green Man in Tearaway. In 2016 he voiced Thorgrim Grudgebearer in Total War: Warhammer.

Most recently, Ridings played a courageous ape named "Buck" in the "Planet of the Apes" prequel, Rise of the Planet of the Apes, which was released in August 2011. In 2015, he played Mr Bumble in the BBC miniseries Dickensian.

Filmography

Film

TV series

Video games

Theatre

References
General
 
 

Specific

External links

1958 births
Living people
20th-century English male actors
21st-century English male actors
English male film actors
English male television actors
English male voice actors
Male actors from Oxfordshire
Male motion capture actors
People from Henley-on-Thames